Sir Lawrence David Freedman,  (born 7 December 1948) is a British academic, historian and author with specialising in foreign policy, international relations and strategy. He has been described as the "dean of British strategic studies" and was a member of the Iraq Inquiry. He is an Emeritus Professor of War Studies at King's College London.

Life 
Freedman was educated at Whitley Bay Grammar School, the University of Manchester (BA), University of York (BPhil), and University of Oxford, where he was a student of Nuffield College (Fellow 1974–75) and the Faculty of Social Studies.  His DPhil thesis, submitted in 1975, was The definition of the Soviet threat in strategic arms decisions of the United States: 1961–1974. He also then held a part-time lectureship at Balliol College.

Career
Freedman held positions at the International Institute for Strategic Studies and Royal Institute of International Affairs (Chatham House) before he was appointed, in 1982, Professor of War Studies at King's College London. He was head of the department until 1997. In 2000, he was the first head of the college's School of Social Science and Public Policy. From 2003 to December 2013, he was a Vice Principal at King's College London. He retired from King's in December 2014. He was appointed a Fellow of the college in 1992. He was appointed a Visiting Professor at the University of Oxford in the Blavatnik School of Government in 2015.

Freedman contributed to the preparation of the 1999 Chicago speech in which Tony Blair set out the 'Blair doctrine'.

Freedman was the official historian of the Falklands campaign, and author of The Official History of the Falklands Campaign, published in two volumes (London: Routledge, 2006).

Freedman's principal areas of interest include contemporary defence and foreign policy issues. He has written extensively on nuclear strategy and the cold war, as well as commentating regularly on contemporary security issues, and provides book reviews for Foreign Affairs. His recent books include an Adelphi Paper on The Revolution in Strategic Affairs, an edited book on Strategic Coercion, an illustrated book on the Cold War, a collection of essays on British defence policy, and Kennedy's Wars that covers the major crises of the early 1960s over Berlin, Cuba, and Vietnam. Kennedy's Wars was a Silver Medal Winner of the Arthur Ross Prize, awarded by the Council on Foreign Relations in New York City. In addition, a book on deterrence was published in 2004. A Choice of Enemies: America Confronts the Middle East (New York: PublicAffairs, 2008), won the 2009 Lionel Gelber Prize and the 2009 Duke of Westminster's Medal for Military Literature. Strategy: A History (New York: Oxford University Press, 2013) was named as one of the best books of 2013 by the Financial Times and was awarded the W J McKenzie Book Prize by the Political Studies Association.

Honours and awards
Freedman was elected a Fellow of the British Academy in 1995 and appointed Commander of the Most Excellent Order of the British Empire in 1996 and Knight Commander of the Most Distinguished Order of St Michael and St George in 2003.

In January 2006, he was awarded the Chesney Gold Medal by the Royal United Services Institute (RUSI) to mark a lifelong distinguished contribution in the defence and international security fields. The citation read:

His other awards include Distinguished Scholar Award from the International Security Studies Section of the US International Studies Association (2007) and the first George G Bell Award for strategic studies leadership from the Canadian International Council (2008).

He was made a member of the Privy Council of the United Kingdom when appointed to the Iraq Inquiry in 2009.

Personal life
His wife is Judith Freedman, Pinsent Masons Professor of Taxation Law and a Fellow of Worcester College at Oxford University. They have two children, Ruth and Sam. Sam is an education policy expert who was a Senior Policy Advisor to the then Secretary of State for Education Michael Gove from 2010 to 2013 and is a Senior Fellow at the Institute for Government.

Selected publications
War, strategy, and international politics: essays in honour of Sir Michael Howard edited by Robert O'Neill, Lawrence Freedman, and Paul Hayes (1992); 
Freedman, Lawrence D. "The Special Relationship, then and now". Foreign Affairs. May/June 2006.
Freedman, Lawrence (2013). Strategy: A History. Oxford: Oxford University Press. .
Freedman, Lawrence (2017). The Future of War: A History. New York: Public Affairs.
 
Freedman, Sir Lawrence (2019). Ukraine and the Art of Strategy. Oxford: Oxford University Press.
Freedman, Lawrence (2022). Command: The Politics of Military Operations from Korea to Ukraine. Oxford: Oxford University Press.

References

Further reading
 Christopher Clark, "'This Is a Reality, Not a Threat'" (review of Lawrence Freedman, The Future of War:  A History, Public Affairs, 2018, 376 pp.; and Robert H. Latiff, Future War:  Preparing for the New Global Battlefield, Knopf, 2018, 192 pp.), The New York Review of Books, vol. LXV, no. 18 (22 November 2018), pp. 53–54.

External links

 Professor Sir Lawrence Freedman home page
 Lawrence Freedman videos on Big Think

1948 births
Living people
Academics of King's College London
Alumni of Nuffield College, Oxford
Alumni of the University of York
Alumni of the Victoria University of Manchester
British foreign policy writers
British Jews
British military historians
Jewish historians
British people of the Falklands War
Chatham House people
Fellows of King's College London
Fellows of Nuffield College, Oxford
Fellows of the British Academy
Commanders of the Order of the British Empire
Knights Commander of the Order of St Michael and St George
Members of the Privy Council of the United Kingdom
Military strategists